Mozo or El Mozo may refer to:

People
Mozo (surname)
El Mozo, Diego de Almagro II, the son of Spanish conquistador Diego de Almagro
El Mozo, Alonso de León, an explorer and governor who led expeditions in southern North America
El Mozo, Francisco de Montejo the Younger, a Spanish conquistador
El Mozo, Francisco Herrera the Younger,  a Spanish painter and architect

Arts and entertainment
Mozo, a film idea that led to the creation of Red Rain (song)
Mozo, a fictional character in Doraemon: Nobita's Chronicle of the Moon Exploration

See also
Moso (disambiguation)
Moza (disambiguation)